State Road 146 (NM 146) is a , paved, two-lane state highway in Grant County in the U.S. state of New Mexico. NM 146's southern terminus is in  Hachita at the road's junction with NM 9. The road's northern terminus is in between Wilna and Separ at the road's junction with Interstate 10 (I-10) and U.S. Route 70 (US 70).

Route description
NM 146 begins at the junction with NM 9 in the village of Hachita. The road heads mostly north through the arid sparsely populated desert plains occupied by ranchos. Continuing north NM 146 arrives at I-10, crosses it over a  bridge, built in 1958 before reaching its northern terminus at intersection with the westbound ramps on  the north side of I-10 and US 70.

History
A road connecting Hachita to the old US 80 east of Separ first appears on the 1935 map as Route 81. In 1939-1940 the road was extended south all the way to Antelope Wells. The segment corresponding to the current NM 146 was paved some time in mid-1950s, while the southern stretch south of Hachita remained "graded". In 1988 the New Mexico Department of Transportation (NMDOT) went through a radical road renumbering program, and the stretch from Hachita to I-10 became known as NM 146, whereas the southern section remained NM 81.

Major intersections

In popular culture 
NM 146 was mentioned in Better Call Saul.

See also

References

External links

146
Transportation in Grant County, New Mexico